Borim or Bori is a census town in Ponda taluka, North Goa district in the state of Goa,
India on the banks of Zuari River. It has a land area of 1536.07 acres and has a population of 8,257. The village has a rich history dating back to the 12th century Kadamba era, when the Kamleshwar temple was built at Deulwada by the Kadamba queen, Kamaladevi.
The name  Bori is etymologically derived from the word  Bora (Indian berry, zizyphus). It is said that the village had many Indian berry or "Bor" trees at some point. Badrigram, a Sanskrit version of the village name, also alludes to the Indian berries, known as Badri in Sanskrit.

Places of interest
Shree Navadurga temple
Siddhnath hill
Shree Sai Baba Devasthan
St Francis Xavier Church
Heritage House of Sawkars
House of the poet Balakrishna Bhagwant Borkar aka Bakibab

Notable individuals
Poet Borkar
Tulsidas Borkar

Gallery

References

Cities and towns in North Goa district
Villages in North Goa district